Lorain County Joint Vocational School is a public vocational school in Oberlin, Ohio. LCJVS primarily serves 13 school districts located in Lorain County, with parts of Erie and Huron counties also covered.

Altogether the school's main campus has an enrollment of about 1,000 high school junior and seniors, while about 300 students study at satellite locations in their member districts.  The affiliated Adult Center also has 4,000 students annually.

Partner schools 

Amherst Steele High School
Avon High School
Avon Lake High School
Brookside High School (Sheffield-Sheffield Lake City Schools)
Clearview High School
Columbia High School
Elyria High School
Firelands High School
Keystone High School
Midview High School
North Ridgeville High School
Oberlin High School
Wellington High School

History 
In the 1960s, Ohio governor James A. Rhodes envisioned joint vocational schools as a way to provide proper technical training for rural school districts that did not offer them as their larger city district counterparts had.  Six districts initially made up Lorain County JVS before it expanded to its current 13.  In the 1980s, the curriculum expanded to include 23 programs, and after the technological boom in the 1990s, more opportunities arose while partnerships with area colleges provided college credits.  A 2,400 sq. ft. greenhouse was eventually added as well.

Along with being ISO 9001:2000 Certified and accredited by the North Central Association, the school is also affiliated with  National Institute for Metalworking Skills (NIMS), National Center for Construction Education & Research (NCCER), American Culinary Federation (ACF), Cisco Systems Networking Academy (Cisco), National Institute for Automotive Service Excellence (ASE), and Automotive Yes (AYES).

Notes

Vocational schools in Ohio